Maple Palm is a 2006 American romantic drama film directed by Ralph Torjan.

Premise
Maple Palm focuses on a lesbian couple, Nicole (Deborah Stewart) and Amy (Andrea Carvajal), who have been living together for fifteen years. Nicole is an illegal immigrant from Canada who has no protection under the law, since same-sex marriages are not recognized by the United States.

Cast
Deborah Stewart as Nicole 
Taymour Ghazi as Glen 
Andrea Carvajal as Amy 
Robert J. Feldman as Billy 
Lynda Lefever as Mom

Reception
Kevin Thomas of the Los Angeles Times was moved by the conviction with which the cast threw themselves into the project, and felt the storyline was one with potential, but felt that the director should have used a lighter hand to increase believability and menace.  Ernest Hardy of LA Weekly felt that the director took an important political and social issue and reduced it to a shameless manipulation of the viewer's emotions.

References

External links

2006 films
Lesbian-related films
American LGBT-related films
2006 romantic drama films
American romantic drama films
LGBT-related romantic drama films
2006 LGBT-related films
2000s English-language films
2000s American films